Werner Spannagel (6 October 1909 – 23 December 1943) was a German boxer who competed in the 1932 Summer Olympics.

He was born in Dahlerau.

At the 1932 Summer Olympics he was eliminated in the quarter-finals of the flyweight class after losing his fight to the upcoming bronze medalist Louis Salica.

In the Second World War, he was sent to the Eastern Front and fought in the army of the Nazi Germany. News of his death was received on 23 December 1943.

References

1909 births
1943 deaths
People from Oberbergischer Kreis
Sportspeople from Cologne (region)
Flyweight boxers
Olympic boxers of Germany
Boxers at the 1932 Summer Olympics
German Army personnel killed in World War II
German male boxers
Military personnel from North Rhine-Westphalia